Fred J. Carpenter (born September 21, 1871, date of death unknown) was a member of the Wisconsin State Assembly.

Biography
Carpenter was born on September 21, 1871 in Plover, Wisconsin. He graduated from the University of Wisconsin Law School. During the Spanish–American War, Carpenter served as a first lieutenant in the United States Army.

Political career
Carpenter was elected to the Assembly in 1902, 1904 and 1906. Additionally, he served as City Attorney and a member of the School Board of Stevens Point, Wisconsin. He was a Republican.

References

External links
The Political Graveyard

People from Stevens Point, Wisconsin
Republican Party members of the Wisconsin State Assembly
20th-century American politicians
School board members in Wisconsin
Wisconsin city attorneys
Military personnel from Wisconsin
United States Army officers
American military personnel of the Spanish–American War
University of Wisconsin Law School alumni
1871 births
Year of death missing
People from Plover, Wisconsin
20th-century American lawyers